Galapagos Airport may refer to:

Seymour Airport, Baltra, Galápagos Islands, Ecuador
San Cristóbal Airport, San Cristóbal, Galápagos Islands, Ecuador